Battle Ax is a shield volcano in the West Cascade Range of Oregon. The shield is mostly made of andesite. The summit, which can be reached via the Battle Ax Mountain trail, marks the boundary between the Mount Hood National Forest and the Willamette National Forest as well as the boundary between the Opal Creek Wilderness and the Bull of the Woods Wilderness.

Battle Ax was supposedly named after the variety of chewing tobacco used by a local logger.

See also 
 List of volcanoes in the United States
 Cascade Volcanoes

References

External links 
 

Shield volcanoes of the United States
Subduction volcanoes
Cascade Volcanoes
Volcanoes of Oregon
Mountains of Oregon
Landforms of Marion County, Oregon
Mountains of Marion County, Oregon